Huangsongyu Township is a township in the northeast corner of Pinggu District, Beijing, China. It lies south of the Yan Mountain Range. The township is located to the south of Douziyu Township, west of Jinhaihu Town, north of Nandulehe Town, and east of Xiong'erzhai Township and Zhenluoying Town. According to the 2020 census, Huangsongyu's population was 5,062. 

The town was named Huangsongyu after Huangsongyu Village, where the town's government is located.

History

Administrative divisions 
As of the time in writing, Huangsongyu Township was composed of 7 villages, all of which can be seen in the following table:

Gallery

See also 

 List of township-level divisions of Beijing

References 

Pinggu District
Township-level divisions of Beijing